Batan Island is an island barangay in Lagonoy Gulf in the Philippines. Along with Rapu-rapu Island it forms the municipality of Rapu-rapu, in the province of Albay in the Bicol region. Batan Island comprises several barangays which includes Batan, Bagaobawan, Manila, and Bilbao.

Islands of Albay
Barangays of Albay